Winter X Games XX (re-titled Winter X Games Aspen '16; styled as Winter X Games Twenty in the official logo) were held from January 28 to January 31, 2016, in Aspen, Colorado. They were the 15th consecutive Winter X Games held in Aspen. The events were broadcast on ESPN.

Participating athletes competed in eight Skiing events, nine Snowboarding events, and three Snowmobiling events.

Results

Medal count

Skiing

Men's SuperPipe results

Women's SlopeStyle results

Women's SuperPipe results

Men's Mono Skier X results

Men's Skier X results

Women's Skier X results

Men's Big Air results

Men's SlopeStyle results

Snowboarding

Special Olympics Unified Snowboarding Dual Slalom results

Women's SlopeStyle results

Men's Big Air results

Men's SlopeStyle results

Men's SuperPipe results
Note: The competition was limited to 1st run scores due to halfpipe conditions becoming unsatisfactory because of inclement weather.

Men's Snowboard X Adaptive results

Men's Snowboarder X results

Women's Snowboarder X results

Women's SuperPipe results

Snowmobiling

SnoCross Adaptive results

SnoCross results

Freestyle results
Joe Parsons won the gold medal by doing an amazing trick that he landed sitting with his back towards the handle bars.

Halo
Halo 5: Guardians 4v4 tournament. The event was part of the Halo Championship Series, but did not have an effect on standings.

References

External links
  Winter X Games XX Page

Winter X Games
2016 in multi-sport events
2016 in American sports
Sports in Colorado
Pitkin County, Colorado
2016 in sports in Colorado
2016 in snowboarding
2016 in alpine skiing
Winter multi-sport events in the United States
International sports competitions hosted by the United States
2016 in esports
January 2016 sports events in the United States